Donald F. Humason Jr. (born July 31, 1967) is an American politician who served as mayor of Westfield, Massachusetts from 2020 to 2022 and current town administrator of Chester, beginning September 6, 2022. A member of the Republican Party, he previously represented the 2nd Hampden and Hampshire District in the Massachusetts Senate from 2013 to 2020, and as representative for the 4th Hampden District in the Massachusetts House of Representatives between 2003 and 2013.

Political career

Massachusetts House of Representatives
In his first bid for public office, Humason was elected on November 5, 2002 with 63% of the vote and was re-elected in 2004, 2006, 2008, 2010, and 2012. He resigned on November 20, 2013 after he was elected to the State Senate.

Humason's committee assignments were as follows.

186th General Court (2009–2011)
 Joint Committee on Consumer Protection and Professional Licensure
 Joint Committee on Higher Education
 Joint Committee on Public Health
 Joint Committee on Transportation
 Joint Committee on Economic Development and Emerging Technologies
187th General Court (2011–2013)
 Joint Committee on Consumer Protection and Professional Licensure
 Joint Committee on Rules
 Committee on Rules
188th General Court (2013–2015)
 Joint Committee on Consumer Protection and Professional Licensure
 Joint Committee on Economic Development and Emerging Technologies
189th General Court (2015–2017)
 Joint Committee on Children, Families and Persons with Disabilities
 Joint Committee on Public Service
 Joint Committee on Veterans and Federal Affairs
 Joint Committee on Ways and Means
 Committee on Intergovernmental Affairs
 Committee on Bonding, Capital Expenditures and State Assets
 Committee on Ways and Means
 Special Committee to Improve Government

Massachusetts Senate
On August 9, 2013, incumbent State Senator Michael Knapik resigned to become Executive Director of Advancement at Westfield State University. Humason defeated Michael Franco in the Republican primary on October 8 and defeated Democratic opponent David K. Bartley 53%-47%. A few weeks later, Humason was named as the new Senate Minority Whip by Senate Minority Leader Bruce Tarr. As Minority Whip, Humason worked to coordinate votes within the Senate Republican Caucus and assist the Minority Leader in developing policy. He submitted his letter of resignation to Massachusetts Senate President Karen Spilka on December 4 upon being elected Mayor of Westfield. A special election was scheduled for March 31, 2020, but was delayed by the COVID-19 pandemic until May 16; it was won by Representative John Velis, who previously won the 2014 special election to succeed Humason in the House.

During his tenure in the Senate, Humason's committee assignments were as follows:
188th General Court (2013–2014)
 Joint Committee on Children, Families and Persons with Disabilities
 Joint Committee on Consumer Protection and Professional Licensure
 Joint Committee on Public Health
 Joint Committee on Public Service
 Joint Committee on Revenue
 Joint Committee on Telecommunications, Utilities and Energy
 Joint Committee on Veterans and Federal Affairs
 Joint Committee on Ways and Means
 Committee on Ways and Means
 Committee on Bonding, Capital Expenditures and State Assets
189th General Court (2015–2016)
 Joint Committee on Children, Families and Persons with Disabilities
 Joint Committee on Education
 Joint Committee on Public Service
 Joint Committee on Veterans and Federal Affairs
 Committee on Intergovernmental Affairs
 Committee on Bonding, Capital Expenditures and State Assets
 Committee on Ways and Means
190th General Court (2017–2018)
Joint Committee on Rules
Joint Committee on Children, Families and Persons with Disabilities
Joint Committee on Public Service
Joint Committee on Transportation
Joint Committee on Veterans and Federal Affairs
Joint Committee on Ways and Means
Special Committee to Review the Sexual Harassment Policies and Procedures
Committee on Bonding, Capital Expenditures and State Assets
Committee on Intergovernmental Affairs
Committee on Rules
Committee on Ways and Means
191st General Court (2019–2020)
Joint Committee on Children, Families and Persons with Disabilities
Joint Committee on Public Health
Joint Committee on Public Service
Joint Committee on Veterans and Federal Affairs
Joint Committee on Ways and Means
Committee on Bonding, Capital Expenditures and State Assets (Ranking Member)
Committee on Ethics (Ranking Member)
Committee on Post Audit and Oversight
Committee on Ways and Means

Towns represented
In Hampden County: Chicopee (Ward 7 - Precinct A and B, Ward 8 - Precinct A, Ward 9 - Precinct A), Holyoke, Westfield, Agawam, Granville, Montgomery, Russell, Southwick and Tolland. In Hampshire County: Easthampton and Southampton.

Appointments
 Senate Minority Whip (2013–2017)
 Military Asset and Security Strategy Task Force
 Senate Assistant Minority Leader (2017–2020)

Mayor of Westfield
In January 2019, two-term incumbent Mayor Brian P. Sullivan announced he would not seek re-election. On March 21, Humason ran for mayor against Michael McCabe, a 34-year captain of the Westfield Police Department. Humason narrowly defeated McCabe in a close race, winning 4,983 votes while McCabe received 4,886. Neither side declared victory as the results were within the margin of error, but McCabe chose not to seek a recount and conceded. He ran for re-election to a second term in 2021, but lost to McCabe in a rematch.

Town administrator of Chester
After his tenure as Mayor of Westfield ended, Humason was chosen by the Chester selectboard to be the next town administrator.

Electoral history
State Legislature

Westfield mayoral election, 2019

Westfield mayoral election, 2021

See also
 2019–2020 Massachusetts legislature

References

External links
 Senator Donald F. Humason Jr. official Massachusetts legislative website
 Biography, voting record, and interest group ratings at Project Vote Smart
 

1967 births
Republican Party members of the Massachusetts House of Representatives
Republican Party Massachusetts state senators
People from Westfield, Massachusetts
Westfield State University alumni
Living people
21st-century American politicians